Ciepłowody  is a village in Ząbkowice Śląskie County, Lower Silesian Voivodeship, in south-western Poland. It is the seat of the administrative district (gmina) called Gmina Ciepłowody.

The village has a population of 1,200.

Notable residents
 Max Näther (1899–1919), World War I pilot

Notes

Villages in Ząbkowice Śląskie County